

D K Jovanovich and Frank Kozloski founded the Helicopter Engineering Research Corporation in Philadelphia, Pennsylvania, in 1946, the predecessor of Jovair. 

In 1949 Jovanovich and Kozloski transferred to the McCulloch Aircraft Corporation, the aircraft division of the McCulloch Motors Corporation, along with its two most promising designs, the J-2 and the JOV-3. In 1960 D K Jovanovich formed Jovair Corporation in El Segundo, California.

References
 

Companies based in Philadelphia
Companies based in El Segundo, California
Defunct helicopter manufacturers of the United States